Gilles Engeldinger (born 4 May 1984) is a Luxembourgian footballer, who currently plays for FC Etzella Ettelbruck in Luxembourg's domestic National Division.

Club career
A defender, he has played for Etzella from 2003, after joining them from FC 72 Erpeldange.

External links
 

1984 births
Living people
Luxembourgian footballers
FC Etzella Ettelbruck players
Luxembourg international footballers
Association football defenders